Leonard Garnsey (10 February 1881 – 18 April 1951) was an Australian cricketer. He played eighteen first-class matches for New South Wales between 1904/05 and 1906/07.

See also
 List of New South Wales representative cricketers

References

External links
 

1881 births
1951 deaths
Australian cricketers
New South Wales cricketers
Cricketers from Sydney